Gulfstream Aerospace Corporation is an American aircraft company and a wholly owned subsidiary of General Dynamics.
Gulfstream designs, develops, manufactures, markets, and services business jet aircraft. Gulfstream has produced more than 2,000 aircraft since 1958. Gulfstream's current range consists of the G280, G550, G500/G600, and G650/G650ER/G700/G800.

History

Origins
The company that evolved into Gulfstream Aerospace Corp. started in the late 1950s when Grumman Aircraft Engineering Co., known for military aircraft production, developed a twin turboprop business aircraft at its facilities in Bethpage, New York, called the Grumman Gulfstream I (G-I). The new aircraft, the first of its kind designed for business travel, was a success, prompting Grumman to develop the jet-powered Grumman Gulfstream II or GII.

1960s
At the start of the GII program, Grumman officials separated the company's civil and military aircraft production to improve efficiency. In 1966, they relocated the civilian component to Savannah, Georgia where they had found a supply of skilled labor, an airfield adjacent to the plant and room for expansion. Transportation facilities suitable for heavy equipment and machinery as well as weather favorable to year-round flight-testing and flight-training operations enhanced Savannah's appeal. The new building opened in June 1967 and was dedicated on September 29, 1967. It housed production and flight testing for the GII. The 100-person work force that built the GII was 90% local, and grew to over 1,700 within a few years.

1970s
On January 2, 1973, Grumman merged its civil aircraft operations with light-aircraft manufacturer American Aviation Corporation. The 256th and final GII delivery took place in 1977. One year later, the Gulfstream line and the Savannah plant were sold to American Jet Industries, which was headed by entrepreneur Allen Paulson. Paulson became the president and CEO of the company, renaming it Gulfstream American. He made a priority of developing the Gulfstream III. The GIII was a new aircraft designed to achieve greater range and speed than the GII. The GIII made its first flight in December 1979, with the first delivery in 1980. It was the first business jet to fly over both poles. The Hustler 400 was a  corporate aircraft that featured a propeller in front for short runway use, and a jet in back for high-altitude cruising. The prototype, designated Hustler 400, first flew on January 11, 1978, but never entered production.

1980s

In 1981, Gulfstream introduced the Gulfstream GIIB. The GIIB had a modified GII fuselage and the GIII wings, complete with winglets. The variant offered weight and performance characteristics similar to the GIII, but with the shorter GII fuselage. Gulfstream completed and delivered approximately 40 GIIBs.

Under Paulson the Savannah work force grew to 2,500 by the spring of 1982. Also in this year, the company's name changed to Gulfstream Aerospace Corporation to reflect its worldwide scope, and a new plane, the Gulfstream IV, was conceived. The following year, Gulfstream offered 8.8 million shares of stock to the public. In 1985, Chrysler Corp. acquired Gulfstream for $637 million as part of the automaker's plan to diversify into high-tech industries. This was also the year that Gulfstream first appeared on the Fortune 500 list, at No. 417. Two years later, the 200th and last Gulfstream III was delivered, and the first delivery of a Gulfstream IV took place. The GIV was the first jet in business aviation to have an all-glass cockpit. In 1989 Chrysler decided to sell Gulfstream, and Paulson teamed with Forstmann Little & Co. – a private equity firm specializing in leveraged buyouts – and bought Gulfstream back.

1990s
The decade that followed the 1989 repurchase was a time of significant advancements for Gulfstream. The company signed a five-year contract with NetJets in 1994. It completed the Gulfstream V Integration Test Facility and rolled out the GV – the first ultra-long range business jet – in 1995. In 1997, Gulfstream began the simultaneous manufacture of two aircraft models – the GIV-SP and the GV. Within a few months of the GV's first delivery in June 1997, it set nearly 40 city-pair and/or speed and distance records, and its development team was awarded the 1997 Robert J. Collier Trophy, the highest honor in aeronautics or astronautics in North America. In 1998, Gulfstream purchased K-C Aviation from Kimberly-Clark Corp. for $250 million, which had operations in Dallas, Appleton, Wisconsin, and Westfield, Massachusetts.

2000s
At the end of the 1990s, General Dynamics purchased Gulfstream, and it opened a $5.5 million aircraft refurbishment and completions support facility in Savannah in 2000. In 2001, it acquired Galaxy Aerospace and with it, the mid-size Astra SPX and super mid-size Galaxy, which were later rebranded the Gulfstream G100 and Gulfstream G200, respectively. Also in 2001, Gulfstream purchased four U.S. maintenance facilities in Dallas, Las Vegas, Minneapolis, and West Palm Beach, Florida. Those service centers, along with a Gulfstream facility in Westfield, Massachusetts, formed General Dynamics Aviation Services, which maintained and repaired Gulfstream and other business-jet aircraft.

In 2002, Gulfstream renamed its products, using Arabic numerals instead of Roman numerals to differentiate its aircraft. At the time, the company's lineup included the ultra long-range Gulfstream G550 and G500, the long-range Gulfstream G400, the mid-range Gulfstream G300 and G200, and the high-speed G100. 2002 was also the year that Gulfstream introduced its Airborne Product Support aircraft, a specially equipped G100. It is used to deliver parts and provide any-time service to Gulfstream customers in North America and the Caribbean who are operating aircraft under warranty.

In 2003, Gulfstream acquired a service center at the London-Luton Airport, the first Gulfstream-owned service center to be operated outside the United States. Also, in 2003, the long-range Gulfstream G450 was introduced. The large-cabin, mid-range G350 was presented a year later. In 2004, Gulfstream was awarded the 2003 Collier Trophy for the development of the G550. It was the second time in less than a decade that Gulfstream had won the award. The G550 is the first civil aircraft to receive a Type Certificate issued by the Federal Aviation Administration (FAA) that includes an Enhanced Vision System (EVS) as standard equipment on an aircraft. The aircraft also contained the first cockpit to incorporate PlaneView®, an integrated avionics suite featuring four 14-inch (36 cm) liquid crystal displays in landscape format.

In 2005, Gulfstream began to offer an in-flight internet connection – its Broad Band Multi-Link (BBML) system. Gulfstream also designed and developed a means of reducing the sonic boom caused by an aircraft "breaking" the sound barrier – the Quiet Spike. The Quiet Spike is a telescopic nose device that softens the effect of the sonic boom by smoothing the pressure wave created by flying at the speed of sound. Gulfstream views lifting the current US supersonic ban as essential for a viable business case for supersonic aircraft.

In 2006, the 12-year production run of the G100 ended, and the Gulfstream G150 entered service to take its place. The G150 was the first business jet to be certified by the FAA for Stage 4, the industry's most stringent noise standards. Also in 2006, Gulfstream announced plans to expand its manufacturing and service facilities in Savannah. The seven-year, $400 million Long-Range Facilities Master Plan included the creation of a new  service center, an independent fuel farm, a  paint hangar and the addition of a new Sales and Design Center. As a result of the expansion, employment at the facility was expected to grow by some 1,100 jobs. To meet the immediate need for engineering office space, Gulfstream opened a Research and Development Center (RDC). The RDC accommodates approximately 750 technical and engineering employees.

In April 2007 Gulfstream broke ground for a new business-jet manufacturing building at its headquarters in Savannah. The following month, the company signed a nine-year lease with North Point Real Estate for a second Research and Development Center. The RDC II consists of an office building, which can accommodate 550 employees, and a laboratory building, which is designed for 150 employees and test equipment used in Gulfstream's research and development work. Gulfstream completed the new Sales and Design Center addition in June and officially opened the first phase of the new Savannah Service Center in August.

In 2007, Gulfstream tested its Synthetic Vision-Primary Flight Display (SV-PFD) and EVS II together for the first time. The SV-PFD is an enhancement to the Gulfstream PlaneView flight displays. It features a three-dimensional color image of terrain overlaid with the primary flight display instrument symbology, which are arranged on the screen to create a large-view area for terrain. By early 2008, the FAA had certified both EVS II and SV-PFD.

On March 13, 2008, Gulfstream announced the introduction of a new business jet: the Gulfstream G650. The G650 offers the longest range, fastest speed, largest cabin and most advanced cockpit in the Gulfstream fleet. It is capable of traveling  at Mach 0.85 or will cover shorter distances at Mach 0.925, making it the fastest civilian aircraft flying at the time.

On October 5 of the same year, Gulfstream announced another addition to its business-jet fleet: the large-cabin, mid-range Gulfstream G250 (later renamed the Gulfstream G280). It is capable of traveling  at Mach 0.80 and has a maximum operating speed of Mach 0.85.

In 2009, the company conducted two powered rollouts one week apart. The Gulfstream G650 officially rolled out of the Savannah manufacturing facility under its own power on September 29, 2009. The G280 followed just one week later.

Both the G650 and the G280 flew before the end of 2009. The G650 took its first flight on November 25, while the G280 went up for the first time on December 11.

2010s
In November 2010, Gulfstream announced an expansion of its Savannah facilities through a $500-million, seven-year plan. The growth resulted in 1,000 additional Gulfstream jobs, an increase of more than 15 percent.
 
In addition to the Savannah expansion, Gulfstream's sites in Westfield, Massachusetts, US, and Luton, UK, also grew in 2011. In October, Gulfstream announced an expansion of its service center at the Barnes Regional Airport in Westfield, Massachusetts, that will result in 100 additional Gulfstream jobs, a nearly 80 percent increase over the size of Gulfstream's Westfield workforce. The Luton service center also relocated to a 75,000-square-foot, more modern hangar. The hangar and accompanying office area nearly doubles space at the site, allowing Gulfstream Luton technicians to service Gulfstream's entire fleet, including the all-new G650, the company's flagship aircraft.

Gulfstream suffered a major setback on April 2, 2011, when one of its G650 ultra long-range business jets crashed on the runway at Roswell, NM, fatally injuring the two test pilots and two flight test engineers on board. The aircraft was conducting a takeoff-performance test during which an engine failure was simulated by reducing the right engine's thrust to idle. The G650 became airborne briefly at a high angle of attack before its right wingtip hit the runway, then slid on the ground and caught fire.

The National Transportation Safety Board (NTSB) determined the probable cause of the crash was an aerodynamic stall of the aircraft due to a failure to properly develop and validate takeoff speeds, persistent and increasingly aggressive attempts to achieve a V2 speed that was too low and an inadequate investigation of previous uncommanded roll events. Following the crash, Gulfstream raised the V2 speed of the G650. The NTSB accused Gulfstream of withholding information and the use of legal counsel during the investigation, which were denied by the company.

In November 2011, the Gulfstream G650 received its provisional type certificate (PTC) from the FAA. This cleared the way for the company to begin interior completions of the ultra-large-cabin, ultra-long-range business jet in preparation for customer deliveries in the second quarter of 2012, as originally planned.

In January 2011, General Dynamics Aviation Services was rebranded as Gulfstream to simplify its brand identity. Gulfstream now owns and operates nine service centers worldwide, plus one component repair facility.

As of late 2012 there were indications that Gulfstream was close to announcing the design of a quiet supersonic business jet, first drawings of which appeared in December 2012.

Gulfstream employs more than 11,500 people at 12 major locations: Savannah, Georgia.; Appleton, Wisconsin; Brunswick, Georgia; Dallas; Las Vegas; Westfield, Massachusetts; West Palm Beach, Florida; Van Nuys and Lincoln, California in the US; London, UK; Mexicali, Mexico, and Sorocaba, Brazil; 

The Gulfstream G500/G600 were unveiled on October 14, 2014, with the G500 taxiing under its own power. It first flew on May 18, 2015. The longer G600 followed on December 17, 2016, intended for delivery in 2018.

The company expects the 2017 deliveries to be the same as 2016 at 115 units: 88 large and 27 midsize G280s.

Following the meet of US President Donald Trump and Qatar’s Emir Sheikh Tamim bin Hamad Al Thani in July 2019, Qatar Airways expressed a desire to buy large-cabin aircraft from Gulfstream.

On October 4, 2021 the company introduced the G400 and G800 to their product line.

Government and special mission aircraft

About 200 Gulfstream are used by 35 governments, mainly the G550 : air transports of heads of state and government, airborne early warning, medical evacuation, high-altitude atmospheric research, and intelligence, surveillance and reconnaissance.

Products

Current products

Product history
The Grumman Gulfstream I (Model G-159) was a twin-turboprop business aircraft, certificated by the FAA on 21/05/1959.

The Grumman Gulfstream II was the first large business jet and basis of the Shuttle Training Aircraft. It had many variants, some still produced today, under the same type certificate:

The later Gulfstream G650 has its own type certificate, approved on 07/09/2012. The new Gulfstream G500/G600 also has a separate type certificate.

Israel Aircraft Industries transferred ownership of the smaller Westwind Astra business jet, approved August 29, 1985 to Gulfstream Aerospace on March 26, 2002. Its derivative Astra SPX, approved January 8, 1996 was then named Gulfstream G100, approved August 9, 2002, and its second derivative Gulfstream G150 was approved on November 7, 2005. The larger IAI Galaxy Type certificate, approved December 16, 1998, was transferred the same day and renamed Gulfstream G200, approved January 16, 2002. It was developed into the Gulfstream G280 which have its own type certificate approved August 30, 2012.

The Gulfstream American Hustler was a prototype business aircraft, which first flew on January 11, 1978, using a turboprop and a turbofan simultaneously. It was developed into prototype military trainer Gulfstream Peregrine 600, first flight May 22, 1981, and the prototype single jet Gulfstream Peregrine, first flight January 14, 1983.

The Sukhoi-Gulfstream S-21 was a projected supersonic business jet.

Community involvement
Gulfstream Aerospace is involved in the local Savannah community through a variety of programs and initiatives. In November 2018, $2 million was donated to the United Way of America. Over 100 programs and services at 58 nonprofits in several Georgia counties have benefited.

See also
 Gulfstream X-54

References

External links

Gulfstream website
Patents owned by Gulfstream Aerospace

1999 mergers and acquisitions
Aircraft manufacturers of the United States
American companies established in 1958
Collier Trophy recipients
Companies based in Savannah, Georgia
Defense companies of the United States
General Dynamics
Manufacturing companies based in Georgia (U.S. state)
Manufacturing companies established in 1958
Private equity portfolio companies
Technology companies established in 1958